Morgan ap Rhys ap Philip (by 1520 – 1543?), of Llanfihangel, Cardiganshire, was a Welsh Member of Parliament.

He was a Member (MP) of the Parliament of England for Cardiganshire in 1542.

References

1543 deaths
Members of the Parliament of England for Cardiganshire
16th-century Welsh politicians
People from Cardigan, Ceredigion
English MPs 1542–1544
Year of birth uncertain